
Listed below are executive orders and presidential proclamations signed by United States President Franklin D. Roosevelt. His executive orders and presidential proclamations are also found on WikiSource.

Executive orders

1933

1934

1935

1936

1937

1938

1939

1940

1941

1942

1943

1944

1945

Presidential proclamations

1933

1934

1935

1936

1937

1938

1939

1940

1941

1942

1943

1944

1945

References

External links
 Franklin D. Roosevelt's Executive Orders
 Executive Orders Disposition Tables National Archives, Federal Register

 
United States federal policy
Executive orders of Franklin D. Roosevelt
Franklin D. Roosevelt-related lists